The Botatwe languages are a group of Bantu languages. They are the languages of Guthrie group M.60 (Lenje–Tonga) plus some of the Subia languages (K.40):

Tonga (incl. Dombe, Leya)
Ila (Lundwe, Sala)
Soli 
Lamba
Lenje (incl. Lukanga Twa)
Subia (K40): Fwe (Sifwe), Kuhane (Subiya, Mbalang'we)
Totela (K41 and K411)

Kafue Twa may be Ila or Tonga.

Nurse (2003) suspects that the Sabi languages may be related.

Notes